The Old Course at St Andrews, also known as the Old Lady or the Grand Old Lady, is considered the oldest golf course. 
It is a public course over common land in St Andrews, Fife, Scotland and is held in trust by the St Andrews Links Trust under an act of Parliament. The Royal and Ancient Golf Club of St Andrews clubhouse sits adjacent to the first tee, although it is but one of many clubs (St Andrews Golf Club, The New Golf Club, St Regulus Ladies Golf Club and The St Rule Club are the others with clubhouses) that have playing privileges on the course, along with some other non-clubhouse owning clubs and the general public. Originally known as the "golfing grounds" of St Andrews, it was not until the New Course was opened in 1895 that it became known as the Old Course.

History
The Old Course at St Andrews is considered by many to be the "home of golf" because the sport was first played on the links at St Andrews in the early 15th century. Golf was becoming increasingly popular in Scotland until James II of Scotland banned the game in 1457 because he felt that young men were playing too much golf instead of practising their archery. The ban was upheld by James III, and remained in force until 1502, when James IV became a golfer himself and removed the ban.

Governance
In 1552, Archbishop John Hamilton gave the townspeople of St Andrews the right to play on the links. In 1754, 22 noblemen, professors, and landowners founded the Society of St Andrews Golfers. This society would eventually become the precursor to The R&A which is the governing body for golf everywhere outside of the United States and Mexico. St Andrews Links had a scare when they went bankrupt in 1797. The Town Council of St Andrews decided to allow rabbit farming on the golf course to challenge golf for popularity. Twenty years of legal battling between the golfers and rabbit farmers ended in 1821 when a local landowner and golfer named James Cheape of Strathtyrum bought the land and is credited with saving the links for golf. 

The course evolved without the help of any one architect for many years, though notable contributions to its design were made by Daw Anderson in the 1850s and Old Tom Morris (1865–1908), who designed the 1st and 18th holes. Originally, it was played over the same set of fairways out and back to the same holes. As interest in the game increased, groups of golfers would often be playing the same hole, but going in different directions.

Influence on modern golf

The Old Course was pivotal to the development of how the game is played today. For instance, in 1764, the course had 22 holes and the members would play the same hole going out and in with the exception of the 11th and 22nd holes. William St Clair of Roslin as the captain of The Captain and Gentlemen Golfers authorized changes to St Andrews on 4 October 1764. He decided that the first four and last four holes on the course were too short and should be combined into four total holes (two in and two out). St Andrews then had 18 holes and that was how the standard of 18 holes was created. Around 1863, Old Tom Morris had the 1st green separated from the 17th green, producing the current 18-hole layout with 7 double greens and 4 single greens. The Old Course is home of The Open Championship, the oldest of golf's major championships. The Old Course has hosted this major 30 times since 1873, most recently in 2022. The 30 Open Championships that the Old Course has hosted is more than any other course, and The Open is currently played there every five years.

Old Course and Bobby Jones
Bobby Jones (who later founded Augusta National) first played St Andrews in the 1921 Open Championship.  During the third round, he infamously hit his ball into a bunker on the 11th hole.  After he took four swings at the ball and still could not get out, he lost his temper and continued the round, but did not turn in his score card, disqualifying himself. However, he did continue to play in the fourth round. Six years later, when the Open Championship returned to St Andrews, Jones also returned. Not only did he win, he also became the first amateur to win back-to-back Open Championships.  He won wire-to-wire, shooting a 285 (7-under-par), which was the lowest score at either a U.S. Open or Open Championship at the time.  He ended up winning the tournament by a decisive six strokes.

In 1930, Jones returned to St Andrews for the British Amateur. He won, beating Roger Wethered by a score of 7 and 6 in the final match. He subsequently won the other three majors, making him the only man in the history of the sport to win the Grand Slam.  Jones went on to fall in love with the Old Course for the rest of his life. Years later, he said "If I had to select one course upon which to play the match of my life, I should have selected the Old Course."  In 1958 the town of St Andrews gave Jones the key to the city; he was only the second American to receive the honour (after Benjamin Franklin in 1759).  After he received the key, he said "I could take out of my life everything but my experiences here in St Andrews and I would still have had a rich and full life."

Features and hazards
ESPN has said of the course, "No other golf course has as many famous landmarks as St. Andrews, its 112 bunkers and endless hills and hollows have been cursed for centuries, and many have their own names and legends." In 1949, the last bunker to be filled in on the course was Hull bunker on the 15th fairway.

The Open Championship

The Open has been staged at the Old Course at St Andrews 30 times. The following is a list of the champions:

Note: Multiple winners of The Open Championship have superscript ordinal designating which in their respective careers.
(a) denotes amateur

Scorecard

Women's British Open 
Winners of the Women's British Open at the Old Course at St Andrews:

Senior Open Championship 
Winners of the Senior Open Championship at the Old Course at St Andrews:

Structures overlooking the Old Course
The following notable structures overlooking the Old Course in a clockwork direction from the north:

See also
Golf in Scotland
St Andrews Links
The Royal and Ancient Golf Club of St Andrews

References

External links

St Andrews Links Trust official site of the Old Course
Golf Course Histories – comparison between 1932 and 2012 course aerials (prior to November 2012 changes)
Top 100 Golf Courses - The Old Course
3D Course Planner at ProVisualizer

Golf clubs and courses in Fife
The Open Championship venues
Curtis Cup venues
Walker Cup venues
Sports venues completed in the 16th century
Sports venues in Fife
Tourist attractions in Fife
St Andrews
1552 establishments in Scotland
16th century in sports